Aud Alvær (27 November 1921 – 11 June 2000) was a Norwegian politician for the Liberal Party.

She served as a deputy representative to the Norwegian Parliament from Bergen during the term 1969–1973.

References

1921 births
2000 deaths
Deputy members of the Storting
Liberal Party (Norway) politicians
Politicians from Bergen
Women members of the Storting
20th-century Norwegian women politicians
20th-century Norwegian politicians